You're Lookin' at Me (A Collection of Nat King Cole Songs) is a 1983 studio album by Carmen McRae, recorded in tribute to Nat King Cole.

The album features guitarist John Collins, a former member of Nat King Coles' trio.

Reception

Allmusic awarded the album four stars and reviewer Scott Yanow said that "Carmen McRae's tribute to Nat King Cole (which predated the late-'80s revival of Cole's music) has its strong and weak points. She wisely adds Cole's former guitarist John Collins to her regular trio and picked some fine material...However McRae's phrasing is much different than Cole's and why did she sing "Sweet Lorraine" without changing any of the words? Despite those reservations, this set has enough strong moments to justify its purchase".

Track listing
 "I'm an Errand Girl for Rhythm" (Nat King Cole) – 3:33
 "Beautiful Moons Ago" (Cole, Oscar Moore) – 3:1
 "The Frim Fram Sauce" (Redd Evans, Joe Ricardel) – 3:58
 "Come in Out of the Rain" (Bob Russell, Carl Sigman, Rupert Wates) – 3:12
 "How Does It Feel?" (Marvin Fisher, Roy Alfred) – 4:04
 "If I Had You" (Jimmy Campbell, Irving King) – 3:49
 "I Can't See for Looking" (Nadine Robinson, Dok Stanford) – 3:29
 "Sweet Lorraine" (Cliff Burwell, Mitchell Parish) – 3:34
 "You're Looking at Me" (Bobby Troup) – 4:12
 "Just You, Just Me" (Jesse Greer, Raymond Klages) – 3:57

Personnel
Carmen McRae – vocals
Marshall Otwell – piano
John Collins – guitar
John Leftwich – double bass
Donald Bailey – drums
Production
Donald Bailey – producer
Phil Edwards – engineer
John S. Wilson – liner notes

References

1983 albums
Carmen McRae albums
Concord Records albums
Nat King Cole tribute albums